A Touch of Frost is a television detective series produced by Yorkshire Television (later ITV Studios) for ITV from 6 December 1992 until 5 April 2010, initially based on the Frost novels by R. D. Wingfield. Writing credit for the three episodes in the first 1992 series went to Richard Harris.

The series stars David Jason as Detective Inspector William Edward "Jack" Frost, an experienced and dedicated detective who frequently clashes with his superiors. In his cases, Frost is usually assisted by a variety of different detective sergeants or constables, with each bringing a different slant to the particular case. Comic relief is provided by Frost's interactions with the bureaucratically-minded Superintendent Norman "Horn-rimmed Harry" Mullett, played by Bruce Alexander.

A number of young actors had their major debut as supporting cast in the show, including: Matt Bardock, Ben Daniels, Neil Stuke, Mark Letheren, Colin Buchanan, Jason Maza, Damian Lewis and Marc Warren.

Background
The series is set in the fictional southern England town of Denton. Denton may be in Berkshire, Oxfordshire or Wiltshire. There are many references to Reading, Oxford, and Swindon. In SE1E1 a character mentions going to Bishop's Stortford, implying it is a short journey away and thus in the Hertfordshire or Essex area.  In SE2E3 a suspect talks about "Driving over to Chelmsford", implying reasonable proximity to Denton, again placing the action in the Herts/Essex area. Frost drives a blue Ford Sierra - D843 MPP. This is a Luton registration (ending 'PP'), a very common registration in Hertfordshire, consistent with Bishop's Stortford. In the earlier episodes, the M4 and A417 were often seen, and the map of Swindon was seen in the control room, although a map of Reading was used occasionally. Paperwork given to Frost and other characters refers to Denton station as being part of the Thames Valley Police. In SE2E4 Frost hurries to Denton station and Network SouthEast branding is visible on the station signs. This is broadly consistent with most of the putative locations listed, though not with the actual Yorkshire locations. In SE4E1 Frost and Toolan observe a train passing, consisting of a British Rail Class 141 Pacer in West Yorkshire Metro red and cream livery coupled with a British Rail Class 142 Pacer in BR Provincial Sector blue livery. Both units in those liveries are quite inconsistent with Network SouthEast but very much with the Yorkshire locations.  In some episodes ambiguous references to 'County' are made. This is inconsistent with Denton being part of Thames Valley since this is not part of a County force. One reference implies 'County' has jurisdiction beyond that of Denton. Either 'County' is the HQ of the county force Denton belongs to, or Denton is a small city force, surrounded by a larger county force. A situation analogous to that of Oxford City Police and Oxfordshire Constabulary pre-1968.

The programme was produced by ITV in Leeds, and most of the outdoor locations were shot in West Yorkshire. Several scenes were filmed in and around the city and district of Wakefield and neighbouring small towns of Pontefract and Castleford, West Yorkshire. Filming location names are sometimes used in lieu of a fictional address, one such example occurs in SE2E1 where Frost is made aware of, and later visits, an address of interest located at King George Gardens. The scene was filmed at King George Gardens, Chapel Allerton, Leeds. The Denton Police Station of early seasons was filmed in an industrial complex at the intersection of Burley Road and Westfield Road in Leeds; this has since been demolished. Seacroft Hospital in Leeds was used as the 'Denton' Hospital.

The role of Frost was notable in changing the public perception of David Jason from a predominantly comic actor to a dramatic actor.

At a press conference in London on 15 September 2008, David Jason announced that he would be quitting the role of DI Jack Frost. Jason's main reason for quitting the role was that Frost was by now the oldest detective on television and he felt that it was 'natural' to retire as Frost. At 68, a police detective would already have been retired for eight years. Sir David said: "You wouldn't want me to play Frost in a wheelchair, would you?... Frost is getting a little long in the tooth. I still enjoy doing it and it's a great part but I just think he's got to retire. It'll be a sad day."

Cast

Main cast
 David Jason as DI Jack Frost
 Bruce Alexander as Superintendent Norman Mullett
 John Lyons as DS George Toolan
 Arthur White as PC Ernie Trigg

Supporting cast

Supervising Officers
 Neil Phillips as DCI Jim Allen (1992–1994)
 Matthew Marsh as DCI Charlie Hawkes (1995)
 Nigel Harrison as DCI Jim Peters (1996–1997)
 Gwyneth Strong as DSI Bailey (1997)
 Michael Cochrane as Chief Superintendent Babcock (2002)

Detective Sergeants
 Tony Haygarth as Sandy Gilmore (1992)
 Caroline Harker as WPC/DS Hazel Wallace (1992–2003)
 Matt Bardock as DC/DS Clive Barnard (1992–1997)
 Sally Dexter as DC/DS Maureen Lawson (1994–2003)
 Neil Stuke as Frank Nash (1996)
 Russell Hunter as Rab Prentice (1996)
 Susannah Doyle as Liz Maud (1997)
 Philip Jackson as Billy Sharpe (1999–2005)
 Paul Jesson as Bill Dorridge (1999–2000)
 Robert Glenister as Terry Reid (2001–2003)
 Cherie Lunghi as Annie Marsh (2008)

Detective Constables
 George Anton as DC Webster (1992)
 Jon Sotherton as Mark Howard (1992–1996)
 Lennie James as Carl Tanner (1994)
 Neil Dudgeon as Frank Costello (1994)
 Jim Shepley as DC Ketley (1994–1996)
 Charles De'Ath as DC Collier (1997)
 Stephen Moyer as DC Burton (1997)
 Nicholas Burns as Jasper Tranter (2004)
 Blake Ritson as Robert "Elvis" Presley (2006)

Uniformed Officers
 Paul Moriarty as Sgt. Bill Wells (1992–1997)
 Bill Roarke as Sgt. Arthur Hanlon (1992–1995)
 Stuart Barren as Sgt. Johnnie Johnson (1992–1996)
 James McKenna as Sgt. Don Brady (1996–2010)
 Martin Moss as PC Lambert (1992)
 Ian Driver as PC Jordan (1992–1994)
 Christopher Rickwood as PC Keith Stringer (1992–1994)
 George Thompson as PC Simms (1992–1996)
 Colin Buchanan as PC Mike Austin (1994)
 Ian Mercer as PC Craven (1996)
 Colette Brown as WPC Claire Toms (1996)
 Katrina Levon as WPC Lindsey Hunter (1996)
 Jan Graveson as WPC Jane Brent (1996)
 Miranda Pleasance as WPC Annie Holland (1997–1999)
 Georgia Mackenzie as WPC Susan Kavanagh (2000)
 Michelle Joseph as WPC Ronnie Lonnegan (2002)
 Emily Corrie as WPC Louise Harmison (2006)

Police Pathologists
 David McKail as Dr. David McKenzie (1992–2008)
 David Gooderson as Dr. Derek Simpkins (1992–2006)

Other Service Personnel
 Ralph Brown as Captain Carlisle (1996)

Characters

Main characters
 DI William Edward "Jack" Frost (David Jason, 1992–2010) is a cynical and mercurial detective, whose talents are offset by human failings which include drinking other people's beverages, a scruffy fashion sense, and leaving his home, office, and car in states of disarray. This is marginally different from how he is portrayed in the novels, where he often lacks sympathy and has a stern, intimidating, almost vitriolic tone. He is frequently shown to avoid paperwork, leaving his subordinates to finish it. He never uses a police notebook to record evidence and other information, instead scribbling notes on various bits of paper which he stuffs in his coat pockets. Frost is widowed in the first episode. He had planned to abandon his wife, but, just as he was going to tell her, he was advised that she had been diagnosed with terminal cancer. After hearing this news, he drunk heavily and deliberately angered an armed man, who shot him. As a result of subduing the man in what was perceived as a courageous, heroic act, Frost was awarded the highest British civilian award for gallantry, the George Cross, but which he describes in Episode 1 as anything but heroic. Whenever he is reminded of his award, he tends to suffer embarrassment and guilt. He is respected and admired by his colleagues and is shown to be a well-meaning but flawed man as acknowledged by troubled youth, the elderly and even by some criminals he has previously arrested. On several occasions, as in the novels, Frost breaks the law and plants evidence to get an arrest or conducts searches without permission (often gaining entry with one of his large bunch of keys, which, of course, is impossible, as he would need hundreds, and selecting the right one first time, equally unlikely) although he always has the correct suspect, as well as helping sympathetic villains or misdemeanours, often to get out of the paperwork. This type of behaviour regularly saw Frost suspended, disciplined or threatened with the same throughout the series. In the first novel, his name is shown to be Jack Frost, when DC Barnard finds his George Cross in a drawer and the inscription reads "To Jack Edward Frost". It was felt by the producers that the name Jack Frost was implausible for the TV series, so Frost was given William as his real first name, or "Billy" as his wife called him, with Jack becoming a nickname. Also in the novels, he was a chain-smoker; this again was altered in the series to have Frost quit smoking in the first episode and occasionally struggle with stopping the habit over the subsequent two series, with a penchant for unhealthy foods taking its place.
 Superintendent Stanley Mullett (Bruce Alexander, 1992–2010), a social climber concerned with appearances and ambitious for promotion, is Frost's boss and his constant foil on the job. Mullett has a love-hate relationship with Frost, whose detective skills he admires but whose people and political skills he abhors. The long-suffering Mullett frequently threatens to sack Frost, but Frost's ability to close cases usually saves him. In addition, receiving the George Cross made Frost "the Chief Constable's blue-eyed boy", thus protecting Frost from being sacked or retired by Mullett. His background in the novels was extensive; highly educated and a qualified solicitor, Mullett always drove a prestige car and was married in the series to Elspeth, who was occasionally seen, and was assured promotion to Chief Superintendent once the new police station was completed. Eventually, this promotion is turned down in a later episode thanks to yet another crisis caused by Frost who, surprisingly, gets off lightly. Frost's nickname for Mullett is "Horn-rimmed Harry" due to the traditional design of his spectacles. Frost also has a plastic, mounted grey mullet hanging on his office wall; a grey mullet is a fish commonly found in British coastal waters but not usually eaten as it is considered bland. Frost constantly tries to avoid Mullett but, just as he thinks he has managed to avoid him, Mullett spots him and generally calls out, "Ah, Jack" to which Frost replies, "Ah, there you are, sir". His first name was given in the novel "Hard Frost" as Stanley, but this novel was not written until a couple of years after the name Norman was given to the character by the writers of the TV series. In the final episode, Mr. Mullett appears to be wearing a blazer with the badge of the Army Intelligence Corps. However, in episode SE3E1, Mullett is shown wearing a blazer with an unidentified British military 'bullion' badge (but not that of the Army Intelligence Corps).

Supervising Officers
 DCI Jim Allen (Neil Phillips, 1992–1994), the first DCI to feature in the series. In the novels, he and Frost are twin DIs, although his upcoming promotion to Chief Inspector is mentioned in the first book but never seems to transpire. Frost and Allen hate each other due to their vastly different work ethic and attitudes, although begrudgingly co-operate on several cases. A recurring theme in the novels is Allen's absence from Denton Station (either sick or temporarily acting as DCI at another station), which leaves Frost under enormous pressure to manage the incoming caseload. In the series, however, he and Frost get on quite well, often working together, sharing jokes about Mullett and concern for each other's emotions on particularly harrowing cases. There is only one significant argument between them when Frost is taken off a serial rape case. Allen was also retained and written into several of the storylines from which he was absent in the novels. He is mentioned in the second episode of the third series as "being away", but is never seen again.
 DCI Charlie Hawkes (Matthew Marsh, 1995), temporarily replaced DCI Allen at the start of the third series. A hands-on leader and popular with his CID and uniform subordinates alike, Hawkes' tenure at Denton is primarily marked by his mishandling of the inquiry into the death of a young girl. Hawkes interrogates and obtains a confession from Billy Conrad, a local male with Down's Syndrome, but Frost finds the actual killer. Furthermore, Hawkes is also in charge when Denton CID inadvertently allows an imposter to pose as a CID officer visiting from the Metropolitan Police.  
 DCI Jim Peters (Nigel Harrison, 1996–1997), replaces temporary DCI Charlie Hawkes. He does not feature in any of the original novels. He is more laid-back and humorous than Allen and appears to have a good relationship with Frost. He is the last DCI featured in the series, with Frost taking over the position in all but name for the rest of the show.
 DSI Bailey (Gwyneth Strong, 1997), is an officer within the regional Discipline & Complaints unit. She orders Frost's suspension due to his handling of a murder solved ten years earlier, occurring when the victim's husband is suspected of murdering his second wife in the present day. Bailey clashes with Mullett over jurisdictional matters and accuses Frost of partaking in a conspiracy of false convictions, led by Frost's former superior Charlie Fairclough. Frost, innocent of the charge, persuades Fairclough to confess to evidence tampering, leading Bailey to reinstate Frost. Despite Bailey's actions during the case and their frequent clashes, Frost also admits during the controversy that she is a good and effective police officer.
 Chief Superintendent Babcock (Michael Cochrane, 2002), is a senior officer within Her Majesty's Inspectorate of Constabulary, who is assigned to review the work of Denton station. The inspection stresses Mullett considerably, and Babcock soon has a strong dislike for Frost, with his ultimate aim being to ensure Frost's dismissal. After Frost stops a serial killer and secures arrests for numerous other separate crimes, Frost and Mullett team up to reject Babcock's attempt to give Denton a bad rating. Babcock acquiesces, but leaves with a parting shot about Frost's methods.

Detective Sergeants
 DS George Toolan (John Lyons, 1992–2010), Jack's long-time friend and colleague with whom he shares an office. George is about the same age as Jack but a rank lower. Though he is more cautious, George is steadfastly loyal to Frost. Originally DCI Allen's assistant, he is later partnered with Frost on many occasions. In the first novel his name was George Martin, but as 'Toolan' he was retained for the series. He is known to have a wife, Mary, who confronts Frost after George is injured by falling from a flight of stairs. He was one of only three characters who stayed with the show until its demise and was the only permanent cast member to be killed off in the show's history. His death plays a role in Frost's decision to retire, as he no longer sees the office as a safe haven to escape his outside troubles without George there.
 Hazel Wallace (Caroline Harker, 1992–2003) is a young, happy-go-lucky uniformed officer. In the first novel, she was originally named Hazel Page and did not appear in any subsequent books, replaced in succession by other female officers, but was retained in the series for continuity. In the first episode she starts a relationship with DC Clive Barnard, but this quickly fizzles out when he is transferred away from Denton. Upon his temporary return, Barnard attempts to rekindle their romance, but she is in another relationship. At the end of the same series, she moves to CID. Though she ceased to be a regular, she continued to make guest appearances in later series and was promoted to detective sergeant. She also gave birth to a daughter whom she brought into the station on one occasion. In the second series she almost fell victim to a serial rapist but overpowered him in her apartment.
 Clive Barnard (Matt Bardock, 1992; 1995-1997) was the nephew of the Chief Constable and newly promoted into CID when he first meets Frost. Most people believe he has only got into CID through his family connections, but Frost sees beyond that and takes Barnard under his wing. Whilst Barnard is transferred away from Frost after only a brief tenure, the two still work together occasionally on cases over the following years. Later promoted to DS, Barnard is shot dead in the line of duty, saving Frost's life. Frost, saying Clive is the real hero, places his George Cross on Clive's body to be buried with him. He appeared in the first novel and was carried across onto the series for continuity.
 Sandy Gilmore (Tony Haygarth, 1992) is a chain-smoking copper of the 80s, who is seconded to Denton CID to cover the number of officers on sick leave. Although he inappropriately tries to smoke in the houses of people he is interviewing and gets a reprimand, Frost begins to like his sense of policing.
 Maureen Lawson (Sally Dexter, 1994–2003) is a strong willed, hardworking gay detective, who sometimes lets her personal judgement get in the way of a decent result. She left divisional CID in 1994 after becoming too involved with one of the cases she was working on, which resulted in a burglary victim being stabbed by her jealous lover; Mullett went on the warpath but Frost, who initially had difficulty coming to terms with her sexuality, swiftly came to her rescue. She later returned to help Frost investigate the murder of a local businessman in the episode "Another Life".
 Frank Nash (Neil Stuke, 1996) is a young, hardworking officer who, after a move to Denton from London, is trying to settle down with his wife and start a family. However, the long hours that Frost makes him work begins to strain his marriage, so he and his wife decide to up sticks and move back to London. Frost tipped Frank for good success and wished him all the best.
 Rab Prentice (Russell Hunter, 1996) is an old-fashioned, laidback Scottish detective, whose stint in Denton CID will mark his last service before retirement. Although capable of obtaining his own information and getting a result, sometimes he needs a push in the right direction from Frost. His constant bemoaning of sex and relationships, and repeated remarks to Frost about old age, easily rile the inspector. To Frost's shock, Prentice applies for the "ill health pension" at the end of the episode (citing "stress") in order to retire early and embark on a relaxed lifestyle.
 Liz Maud (Susannah Doyle, 1997) is a high-flying detective who transferred to Denton from the West End. Ambitious and driven, Maud looked to work her way up the ranks and sought duties as an Acting Detective Inspector when DCI Peters was temporarily reassigned to another station. Whilst investigating instances of child abuse, Maud filed a report in disagreement with Frost's handling of a vulnerable suspect. However, it had unintended consequences that nearly ruined Frost's career when the suspect was accused of three murders. Horrified at the consequences, Maud worked with Frost to find the true killers. Despite this incident, Maud and Frost developed a working relationship, though she decided to return to the West End after Mullett refused another request for promotion.
 Billy "Razor" Sharpe (Philip Jackson, 1999–2005) is nicknamed "Razor" as a pun because he appears not to be very sharp. Frost describes him as a "plodder" who "double checks everything", adding, "that's just the sort of person I need". Although he retired from divisional CID, he returned to help Frost investigate a case of an old friend in the episode "Near Death Experience".
 Bill Dorridge (Paul Jesson, 1999–2000) was assigned by newly promoted Assistant Commissioner Cremond to temporarily replace DS George Toolan, who was temporarily reassigned to "community duties" due to disciplinary action. Dorridge is an amiable, by-the-book detective with experience in most investigative sections, especially liking commercial fraud.
 Terry Reid (Robert Glenister, 2001–2003) is a tough London detective who has suffered from alcohol and drug addictions in the past. He has often been in trouble for his extreme methods, though he has mellowed by the time we meet him. Frost takes a liking to him after he gets to know him. Frost's curiosity leads him to ask Trigg about Reid's military background in the Parachute Regiment. Reading Reid's military file, he learns about an act of bravery for which he was awarded the Military Medal.
 Annie Marsh (Cherie Lunghi, 2008) is a hardworking detective from Manchester who is not keen on Frost's methods of cutting corners and bending the rules to get a result. Once, before she and Frost were posted at Denton, she reported him for endangering the life of a young PC and being unprofessional – something he took to heart and still remembers to this day.

Detective Constables
 Webster (George Anton, 1992) is partnered with Frost during a series of investigations occurring within a close time frame, namely a robbery at a local casino, a hit-and-run death connected to the son of the local MP and the escape of a bank robber. When PC Shelby, a confident and charming uniformed officer with a reputation as a ladies' man is murdered, Frost investigates and theorises that Webster killed him because Shelby had been having an affair with his wife. Whilst Webster denied such charges and goaded Frost to prove them, the next series implied that Frost was ultimately successful in proving his case and that Webster had been sentenced for his crime.
 Carl Tanner (Lennie James, 1994) is a black officer seconded to support Frost with investigations into a murder and a series of burglaries within a black majority area of Denton. Appointed by Mullett purely for ethnically sensitive public relations, Tanner nonetheless proves himself to Frost as an able, dedicated officer. However, despite their newly formed working relationship, Tanner is reassigned again by Mullett following the conclusion of the cases.
 Costello (Neil Dudgeon, 1994) is an unpopular officer with a negative perception of him when he becomes Frost's partner. This is due to Costello being reassigned to Denton CID after punching a DCI in his former unit. Moody, sullen and cynical, it's only when Frost issues a stern warning about Costello's conduct that he lightens up and shows Frost exactly why he's a good officer.

Uniformed officers
 PC Ernie Trigg (Arthur White, 1994–2010), the police archivist of paper files and pre-computer information. He helps Frost with knowledge of known associates and crime methods he has collected over the years that are not available in the police computer system. He and Frost knew each other long before they were stationed at Denton. White, who played the character, is David Jason's real-life brother.
 WPC Claire Toms (Colette Brown, 1996), serves as Frost's partner during an operation to recover a kidnap victim being held to ransom. With training in kidnap recovery and hostage negotiation, Toms proves to be a useful and capable partner despite her youth and junior rank. After the successful conclusion of the operation, Toms returns to other duties and isn't seen again.
 PC Craven (Ian Mercer, 1996), a patrol officer whom Frost encounters a few times during the course of his investigations. When Frost is rendered homeless after a house fire and moves into the shared accommodation block for police officers, Craven is one of his flatmates. Craven is perturbed to find food from the shared kitchen going missing, unaware that Frost himself is the culprit. 
 WPC Lindsey Hunter (Katrina Levon, 1996), is temporarily seconded from uniform into CID to support Frost's investigation of an assault on a student at Denton University. After the case is solved and the culprit apprehended, Hunter returns to uniform, earning Frost's respect and gratitude for her competent conduct during the investigation.
 WPC Holland (Miranda Pleasence, 1997-1999), attracts Frost's ire and irritation during an investigation into the circumstances of an elderly woman murdering her husband. Frost, sympathetic to the elderly woman's plight given the long-term abuse she suffered from her husband, chastises Holland's more callous attitude. Around the same time, Holland is also romantically involved with DS Barnard and is devastated by his death in the line of duty.
 WPC Ronnie Lonnegan (Michelle Joseph, 2002), is temporarily assigned to CID to support Frost during a time when Denton station is under inspection. A black, female officer who is recently widowed, Lonnegan dismisses a series of early gaffes from Frost about her status, and the two work well together during a series of investigations that ultimately coalesce around hunting a serial killer stalking Denton. After the killer is caught, Lonnegan returns to her former duties.

Other Service Personnel
 Captain Carlisle (Ralph Brown, 1996), a member of the Royal Military Police and Special Investigation Branch  who is forced to partner with Frost during an investigation into the murder of a Territorial Army volunteer at Denton's army base. Whilst Frost and Carlisle initially clash extensively, they eventually work together to solve the murder and uncover other crimes on the base, including the illegal selling of weapons and blackmail. 
 Christine Moorhead (Phyllis Logan, 2010), an RSPCA officer who works with Jack to help crack his final case, involving dog fighting. She later becomes a key witness in a murder and the couple becomes closer. Jack finds himself bonding with her teenage children and, as such, the pair decide to marry. However, on their wedding day, her ex-husband, in a drunken fit of jealousy, tries to kill Jack by ploughing into the side of his car in his 4x4. However, he misses, instead killing DS George Toolan. It is on the strength of his relationship with Christine that Jack decides to retire, now that he has something outside the station to live for.

Civilians
 Shirley Fisher (Lindy Whiteford, 1992–2000), the nurse who cared for Jack's terminally ill wife. She develops a relationship with Jack after a chance encounter at Denton General Hospital, which continues for some time. Still, the relationship is strained when Shirley begins to realise she can't cope with the demands of Jack's job and feels that he has his priorities the wrong way round, with him frequently standing her up on important occasions, including his George Cross recipient reunion (where she was left waiting at the train station) and her mother's funeral. The pair decide to separate and, although Jack on several occasions seems to regret their parting, especially in "Line of Fire", the two remain separated.
 Rosalie Martin (Isla Blair, 1996-1997), encounters Frost when he investigates the murder of a gigolo whom Rosalie had been seeing as one of his clients. Rosalie's husband had been terminally ill at the time, with the stress of caring for him requiring Rosalie to turn to the gigolo for comfort. A spark develops between Rosalie and Frost during the case, so after her husband passes away and Frost solves the crime, Rosalie thanks him and promises to contact him when she's ready to move on romantically. She does so a year later, leading her and Frost to begin a relationship. However, this is brief and ends when Rosalie confesses she has feelings for another man before leaving Frost.   
 Kitty Rayford (Gwyneth Powell, 1997), an ex-prostitute who Jack knew in her youth when she often passed through the station and spent a night or two in the cells. She and Jack meet again in "Penny for the Guy" when he crashes into her car after skipping a temporary red light. The pair maintain a physical relationship until they go their separate ways in "True Confessions" as Frost realises he cannot give Kitty the ongoing companionship she desperately desires.
 Dr. Pam Hartley (Susan Penhaligon, 2002), is a criminal profiler who Jack meets at a training course for law enforcement and social services personnel. Frost soon seeks Pam's advice about a suspected serial killer he is hunting and the two spark up a relationship simultaneously. However, the serial killer kidnaps Pam because she had previously recommended he was taken into care as a child, in order to be removed from his abusive father. The killer attempts to drown Pam in a water works but Frost saves her in the nick of time. Despite the two still being in a relationship at the end of the episode, Pam is not seen again and is presumed to have broken up with Jack between series.

Production
The series is based on the novels of R. D. Wingfield:
 Frost at Christmas (1984)
 A Touch of Frost (1987)
 Night Frost (1992)
 Hard Frost (1995)
 Winter Frost (1999)
 A Killing Frost (2008)

By discarding several minor sub-plots in "Frost at Christmas", the two major cases were able to be investigated in the one episode, being the pilot "Care and Protection". This novel, and the pilot, introduced the characters of Frost, Mullet, DI Allen (DCI in the series), DS George Martin (Toolan in the series), Sgt. Bill Wells, Sgt. Johnny Johnson, DS Arthur Hanlon (uniform sergeant in the series), DC Barnard, PC Jordan, PC Simms, WPC Hazel Page (Wallace in the series), PC Stringer, newspaper reporter Sandy Lane (Longford in the series), Dr McKenzie, pathologist Drysdale (Simpkins in the series), his assistant Miss Grey and Shirley, Frost's on/off love interest.

Due to their length, many of the other books were split into multiple episodes. "A Touch of Frost" was split over three episodes. "Night Frost" was split over two (although the element of DS Gilmore's marriage break-up was used in the series 4 episode "The Things We Do for Love", which has no other reference to "Night Frost", for the series-only character of DS Nash). "Hard Frost" was the last and perhaps most closely referenced novel filmed, which was split across two almost unrelated episodes. Despite the show still being produced when the last two novels were written, they were never used as source material for episodes, possibly due to their more graphic subject matter.

The iconic saxophone solo heard during the show's theme music was performed by Barbara Thompson.

The aspect ratios of A Touch of Frost have been the subject of discussion. From series 1 through to 5, the series was originally shown and transferred to DVD in the 4:3 aspect ratio (which was still mostly the UK television norm in the 1990s). From series 6 onwards, the show was shown in a widescreen 16:9 aspect ratio. The DVD releases reflected this change. However, from 2012, ITV3 HD have been broadcasting a growing number of episodes of the series in high definition, remastered from the original 16mm source. In these HD versions, even the opening series are shown in widescreen. Comparisons to the 4:3 version of the shows (still available on DVD) have shown that the frame has been "opened-up" to include previously unseen parts of the frame. This not only means that these episodes fit the widescreen ratio without cropping out important material, they are a new experience.

Episodes

International broadcast
In Australia, the series aired on ABC, UK.TV and 7Two. In Canada, the series aired on Knowledge, SCN and TVOntario. In New Zealand, the series aired on Prime, TV1 and UK.TV. In the United States, the series aired on A&E Network. In the Netherlands, the series aired on KRO, while in Italy on La7. Other countries that have aired the series include Belgium, Croatia, Denmark, Finland, France, Japan, Norway and Sweden.

In Ireland the series originally aired on RTÉ, but was later dropped by RTÉ in the early 2000s and was not acquired by TV3 Ireland (which was then part owned by ITV, until 2006), however with the introduction of UTV Ireland in 2015 the series made a return and has aired across all Virgin Media channels (formerly TV3) since UTV Ireland's takeover in 2017.

DVD releases

Prequel series
Free @ Last TV, who produced the Sky1/Acorn TV series Agatha Raisin, are developing a prequel series, based on the novel First Frost, published in 2011 by Transworld Publishers Ltd.

References

External links

1992 British television series debuts
2010 British television series endings
1990s British crime drama television series
1990s British mystery television series
1990s British police procedural television series
1990s British workplace drama television series
1990s British comedy-drama television series
2000s British crime drama television series
2000s British mystery television series
2000s British police procedural television series
2000s British workplace drama television series
2000s British comedy-drama television series
2010s British crime drama television series
2010s British mystery television series
2010s British police procedural television series
2010s British workplace drama television series
2010s British comedy-drama television series
British detective television series
English-language television shows
ITV crime dramas
ITV mystery shows
Television series by ITV Studios
Television series by Yorkshire Television
Television shows based on British novels
Television shows set in South Yorkshire
Television shows set in West Yorkshire
Television shows set in Yorkshire